Charles Codman Cabot (November 22, 1900 – 1976) was an American judge of the Supreme Court of Massachusetts.

Early life
Cabot was born in Brookline, Massachusetts. His father was Henry Bromfield Cabot, a lawyer. His mother was Anne Macmaster (Codman) Cabot, daughter of Charles R. Codman. He had five siblings: Henry Bromfield Cabot Jr. (b. 1894), Powell Mason Cabot (b. 1896), Paul Codman Cabot (b. 1898), cofounder of America's first mutual fund and "Harvard's [Endowment] Midas," Anne M. Cabot (b. 1903), and Susan M. Cabot (b. 1907).

Cabot graduated from Harvard College and Harvard Law School.

Career
Cabot was a law partner of a prominent Boston law firm, and an associate justice of the Supreme Court of Massachusetts from 1943 to 1947. He was also the World War II U.S. Strategic Bombing Survey secretariat.

Cabot was president of the Boston Bar Association from 1950 to 1952. He was on the board of directors of the eugenicist Pioneer Fund from 1950 until 1973, and president of the Harvard Alumni Association.

References

1900 births
1976 deaths
Cabot family
People from Brookline, Massachusetts
Massachusetts state court judges
American people of World War II
20th-century American lawyers
Harvard Law School alumni
20th-century American judges
Harvard College alumni